The 1960 Copa de Campeones de América was the first season of the Copa CONMEBOL Libertadores, CONMEBOL's premier club tournament. Seven association's clubs entered the first competition, with three not sending a representative. The first match of the tournament was played between Uruguayan side Peñarol and Bolivian side Jorge Wilstermann on April 19 in Montevideo, Uruguay.

During that game, Ausberto García of Jorge Wilstermann became the first player to move the ball in the tournament setting the motions for what is to become one of the most prestigious competitions in the world. Carlos Borges of Peñarol scored the first goal of the tournament, with teammate and legendary figure Alberto Spencer scoring the first hat-trick.

Peñarol would go to become the first South American club champion after defeating the Olimpia in the finals. With the subsequent results on later editions, Peñarol became the most successful club in the competition until 1973.

Background
CONMEBOL, the governing body of the sport in South America, had been formed in 1916, but for the first forty-three years of its existence, its member associations played only friendly matches against each other, with no prizes at stake. In 1958, however, José Ramos de Freitas, the confederation's president, finally set into motion a competition open to all national champions of the continent, with a trophy to be awarded to the winners. The South American Championship of Champions was the inspiration for the idea to take fruit and formation. Although all national association's champions were eligible to participate, only seven chose to do so: Bahia of Brazil, Jorge Wilstermann of Bolivia, Millonarios of Colombia, Olimpia of Paraguay, Peñarol of Uruguay, San Lorenzo of Argentina and Universidad de Chile of Chile. Peru and Venezuela did not send their respective national league champions since the tournament received general lack of interest from its associations, and Ecuador did not have a national champion to send. The first edition of the Copa de Campeones aroused no great accompaniment to the press particularly in Pacific Rim countries and in Brazil and Argentina.

Teams

Notes

Format 
Each match-up was a two-team group stage. Wins were awarded two points, 1 point for a draw, and no points for a loss. The team with the most points after a home and away game advanced to the next stage. If the teams still remained tied, goal difference will become a factor. A one-game playoff would be implemented in case the teams are still tied. A draw of lots was to become the last solution to breaking a tie.

Preliminary round
Due to there being an odd number of teams in the competition after Universitario of Peru withdrew before the draw, Olimpia received a bye. 

The series between San Lorenzo and Bahia finished in a draw on points and the group was decided on goal difference in which the Argentines were allowed through to the semi-finals. Peñarol and Millonarios completed the semi-final line-up after convincing victories over Jorge Wilstermann and Universidad de Chile, respectively.

There was much publicity in Montevideo as the Bolivian champions Jorge Wilstermann arrived four days ahead of the historic, first ever match of the competition. Unlike what was happening in the five other countries of the competitors, the tournament was receiving a lot of coverage from the Uruguayan media. The President of the Bolivian Football Federation, Valera Cámara, arrived in Montevideo nine days before the game to prepare all the details for the stay of the football champion of his country. He also used the occasion to promote the Campeonato Sudamericano that Bolivia was going to organize in 1961 (eventually held in 1963) and to confirm the matches Bolivia was going to play against Uruguay for the qualifiers of the 1962 FIFA World Cup to be held in Chile. Pablo Pérez Estrada, president of Jorge Wilstermann, arrived on April 13.

The 1972 edition of the Journal Estadio de Chile mentioned that the humiliating elimination of Universidad de Chile was attributed to the exhaustion of the team. Estadio mentions that by that time the interest of the La U executives was to take the Chilean champion for an extensive tour to Europe that was extended, on their return, with some more friendly matches in Central America. The Chilean press, highly critical by the 0–6 thrashing in Santiago, labeled Universidad de Chile as a "team of tourists" and even gave them an alluding cartoon.

Group 1

Group 2

Group 3

Semifinals
All matches from this stage of the competition onwards resulted in draws except for two. Both semi-final matches of semifinal group A finished in a draw and thus it went into a play-off on a neutral venue. Chile was designated as the venue in which a tie-breaking playoff would be contested in case there was a tie on points. However, the 1960 Valdivia earthquake forced a change of location; Peñarol didn't accept the playoff to be held in Asunción. San Lorenzo, however, allowed the play-off to be held in the home ground of Peñarol in exchange for $100.000. José Sanfilippo later recalled:

Olimpia secured the second place in the final by thumping Millonarios at the second leg.

Semifinal A

Semifinal B

Finals

The finals were contested between Peñarol and Olimpia over two legs, one at each participating club's stadium. The first leg took place at the Estadio Centenario in Montevideo in which the Manyas won 1–0 thanks to an Alberto Spencer goal late in the game. The second leg was played in the Estadio Manuel Ferreira in Asunción. Olimpia   was leading 1–0 for the majority of the match, but Luis Cubilla scored the equalizer with only six minutes left in the match to give Peñarol the trophy in the first edition of the competition.

Champions

Top goalscorers

References

Footnotes

A.  Brazil did not have a national league at the time. Instead they sent their Taça Brasil champion.

External links
1960 Copa Libertadores at RSSSF
1960 Copa Libertadores at Terra 
1960 Copa Libertadores at Soccer Mond
1960 Copa Libertadores at Torcida
1960 Copa Libertadores at www.libertadores.ru

1
Copa Libertadores seasons